"Love Scenario" is a song recorded by South Korean boy group iKon. It was released as the lead single of their second studio album, Return. The song won "Song of the Year" at the 2018 Melon Music Awards and 33rd Golden Disc Awards. It is recognized as iKon's signature song.

Background and composition
"Love Scenario" is described as a mellow, yet relatively upbeat, with a circuitous melody that guides the rhythmic dance track.

"I wanted to express what I found regrettable, neither sad nor happy, in the warm farewell which inspired me by the last 10 minutes of the film La La Land," group leader and songwriter B.I stated. He continued, "The main protagonist smiles at his past lover in the end, and I felt, 'That's enough.'"

Chart performance
Upon its release, "Love Scenario" topped China's QQ Music's real-time chart. It also entered the top 10 on QQ Music's weekly chart. In South Korea, the song debuted at 12 on the Gaon Weekly Chart. It topped the chart for six weeks straight, becoming the longest-running number-one song in Gaon history. On February 5, it reached number one on numerous digital platforms such as iChart, Melon, Genie, Bugs, Mnet, Naver, and Soribada, and also number one on the weekly overall chart, Instiz's iChart. They are the second boy band to ever have achieved number one on more than seven music charts since iChart began ranking songs in 2010, with Big Bang having previously accomplishing a similar feat. The group managed to achieve 204 hourly Perfect All Kills, where a song is number one on all charts for a certain amount of time. The song spent 913 hours at number one on the Melon Chart and 40 days at number one on the Melon daily chart.

The group was named top artists of the first half of 2018 by Genie Music, as they topped their daily chart for 35 days.

"Love Scenario" became the first song to receive a Gaon platinum certification from the Korea Music Content Industry Association in the streaming category after surpassing 100 million streams.

Critical reception
Billboard praised the song, saying it "is guided by a gentle cowbell-style beat and swaying vocals. The song relays a mellow, yet relatively upbeat, reaction to breaking up, with a circuitous melody that guides the rhythmic dance track. It's more emotional than their boisterous most-recent singles, and serves as a subtle directional change and maturing for iKON." "Love Scenario" was also chosen as Apple Music's Best of the Week.

Impact
The song achieved substantial popularity, especially from kindergarteners and elementary schoolers due to its easy-to-follow melodies and lyrics. Some elementary schools banned students from singing "Love Scenario" in classrooms because of its inappropriate content and students showing signs of addiction to catchy tunes. It was featured in several popular Korean TV shows, including Running Man and Infinite Challenge. 

The song was also made into an exclusive in-game emote in Fortnite that fans can get by purchasing any Galaxy S10 series smartphone through the partnership between Epic Games and Samsung Mobile.

Music video
The "Love Scenario" music video was shot with a motion control camera. The background displays nostalgic scenery and props; each scene consists of naturally connected shots, and the Korean media said that this production method adds "fun" to the film. The music video also shows the synchronized dance of seven members, with love stories shown in the background to reflect the lyrics. Among them, the film presents a period from top to bottom, showing iKon's star-shaped dance, which was called the highlight of the music video by Billboard.

On May 24, 2021, the music video reached 500 million views on YouTube.

Chinese and Japanese version 
On the 12th of July, the Chinese version of the hit song was released, with the lyrics being written by Tiger Hu. While in 2019, the Japanese version was released on the 27th of February.

Charts

Weekly charts

Year-end charts

Accolades

Certifications

See also 
 List of M Countdown Chart winners (2018)

References

2018 songs
IKon songs
Korean-language songs
Gaon Digital Chart number-one singles
Billboard Korea K-Pop number-one singles